Starobiktovo (İśke Beyektaw) is a rural locality (a village) in Novomedvedevsky Selsoviet, Ilishevsky District, Bashkortostan, Russia. The population was 63 as of 2010. There is 1 street.

Geography 
Starobiktovo is located 34 km north of Verkhneyarkeyevo (the district's administrative centre) by road. Starokirgizovo is the nearest rural locality.

References 

Rural localities in Ilishevsky District